El Paso Stampede is a 1953 Western film directed by Harry Keller.

Plot
Federal Marshal "Rocky" Lane (Allan Lane) saddles up Black Jack to go to the Mexican border to investigate cattle rustling during the Spanish–American War He gets a job with feed-merchant Nugget Clark, and discovers that Nugget's wizened little helper, Josh Bailey has been giving cattle shipment information to the town dentist, Mason "Doc" Ramsey. Ramsey happens to be the secret leader of the rustlers headed by Floyd Garnett. When Ramsey and Garnett steal some of Nugget's cattle feed, Rocky follows them to their hideout through a waterfall into a hidden valley. The outlaws have kidnapped Alice Clark, and Rocky captures Ramsey after Garnett is killed in a gun battle.

Cast
 Allan Lane – 'Rocky' Lane
 Black Jack – Rocky's Horse
 Eddy Waller – Nugget Clark
 Phyllis Coates – Alice Clark
 Stephen Chase – Mason 'Doc' Ramsey
 Roy Barcroft – Floyd Garrett
 Edward Clark – Josh Bailey
 Tom Monroe – Marty
 Stanley Andrews – Marshal Zeke Banning
 William Tannen – Joe

References

External links
 El Paso Stampede (1953) at IMDb

1953 films
American Western (genre) films
1953 Western (genre) films
Films directed by Harry Keller
American black-and-white films
1950s English-language films
1950s American films